Delaware County Courthouse Square District is a national historic district located at Delhi in Delaware County, New York. The district contains 18 contributing buildings and one contributing structure.  It consists of a distinctive and unspoiled grouping of 19th century governmental, commercial, and religious structures built around the village green. It includes the county courthouse and clerk's office, the local New York State DMV, several county department offices, and a bandstand.  It also includes the buildings surrounding the green.  The -story brick courthouse building was designed by Isaac G. Perry and features a mansard roof.  Also within the district are the Presbyterian church (1831) and Bank building (1838).

It was listed on the National Register of Historic Places in 1973.

See also
National Register of Historic Places listings in Delaware County, New York

References

National Register of Historic Places in Delaware County, New York
Historic districts on the National Register of Historic Places in New York (state)
County courthouses in New York (state)
Historic districts in Delaware County, New York
Courthouses on the National Register of Historic Places in New York (state)